Adirondack Regional Hospital was a 50-bed 1964-proposed medical facility built in upstate New York's Corinth.

History
Adirondack became eligible for payments from Medicare and Medicaid in 1967. The reasons they closed included money matters and insufficient utilization.

Their Corinth location became Adirondack Clinic.

References

  

Hospitals in New York (state)